Jake Foster (born 5 October 1988) is an Australian rugby league footballer playing for the Eastern Suburbs Tigers in the Queensland Cup, as a .

Playing career
A Guildford Owls junior, Foster debuted in the NRL in 2010 for the Canterbury-Bankstown Bulldogs and played ten matches for the club before joining the Canberra Raiders for the 2013 NRL season.

Foster made his representative debut for the Indigenous All Stars side in the 2013 All Stars match on 9 February.

On 6 November 2014, Foster signed with Queensland Cup team Eastern Suburbs Tigers full time for the 2015 season.

References

1988 births
Australian rugby league players
Indigenous Australian rugby league players
Canberra Raiders players
Canterbury-Bankstown Bulldogs players
Indigenous All Stars players
Mount Pritchard Mounties players
Rugby league second-rows
Rugby league locks
Rugby league five-eighths
Living people
Rugby league players from Sydney